Tetratheca is a genus of around 50 to 60 species of shrubs  endemic to Australia. It is classified in the botanical family Elaeocarpaceae, now known to encompass the family Tremandraceae, which the genus originally belonged to. It occurs throughout extratropical Australia, and has been recorded in every mainland state except the Northern Territory.

Origin and evolution 
The origin of the genus is thought to be south-western Western Australia, radiating eastward. The distribution of Tetratheca is mainly across the temperate southern part of the continent. Most species are localised endemics and are highly disjunct from each other. Very few are widespread across Australia; none occurs in the Nullarbor Plain and only seven are found on both the western and the south-eastern sides. (McPherson, 2008). The formation of the Nullarbor is thought to have created a barrier to dispersal between the east and west.

It is estimated that the family Elaeocarpaceae is 120 million years old and Tetratheca estimated to be around 37 to 39 million years old, with major diversification over the Miocene and evolving much faster than their relatives, many of which are rainforest species. This coincides with the rapid radiation and diversification of other sclerophyllous groups.

Species

Species include:

Tetratheca affinis Endl. 
Tetratheca aphylla F.Muell. - Bungalbin tetratheca
Tetratheca bauerifolia F.Muell. ex Schuch. - heath pink-bells 
Tetratheca ciliata Lindl. - pink-bells   
Tetratheca confertifolia Steetz  
Tetratheca decora Joy Thomps.   
Tetratheca deltoidea Joy Thomps. 
Tetratheca efoliata F.Muell.     
Tetratheca elliptica Joy Thomps.  
Tetratheca ericifolia Sm.  
Tetratheca erubescens J.P.Bull 
Tetratheca exasperata R.Butcher  
Tetratheca fasciculata Joy Thomps. - Cronin's tetratheca
Tetratheca filiformis Benth.  
Tetratheca glandulosa Sm. 
Tetratheca gunnii Hook.f. - shy susan   
Tetratheca halmaturina J.M.Black - curly pink-bells
Tetratheca harperi F.Muell. - Jackson tetratheca
Tetratheca hirsuta Lindl. - black-eyed susan
Tetratheca hispidissima Steetz  
Tetratheca insularis Joy Thomps.  
Tetratheca juncea Sm.  
Tetratheca labillardierei Joy Thomps. 
Tetratheca neglecta Joy Thomps.  
Tetratheca nephelioides R.Butcher  
Tetratheca nuda Lindl. 
Tetratheca parvifolia Joy Thomps.   
Tetratheca paucifolia Joy Thomps.   
Tetratheca paynterae Alford  
Tetratheca phoenix R.Butcher 
Tetratheca pilata R.Butcher 
Tetratheca pilifera Lindl.  
Tetratheca pilosa Labill. - hairy pink-bells
Tetratheca procumbens Hook.f. - mountain pink-bells
Tetratheca pubescens Turcz.   
Tetratheca remota Joy Thomps. 
Tetratheca retrorsa Joy Thomps.  
Tetratheca rubioides A.Cunn.  
Tetratheca rupicola Joy Thomps. 
Tetratheca setigera Endl. 
Tetratheca shiressii Blakely  
Tetratheca similis Joy Thomps.  
Tetratheca stenocarpa J.H.Willis  - long pink-bells
Tetratheca subaphylla Benth. - leafless pink-bells
Tetratheca thymifolia Sm.  - black-eyed susan, thyme pink-bells
Tetratheca virgata Steetz

References

 
Oxalidales of Australia
Elaeocarpaceae genera